Head Games is an original novel written by Steve Lyons and based on the long-running British science fiction television series Doctor Who. It features the Seventh Doctor, Bernice, Chris, Roz, Mel and Ace.

Head Games is a sequel to Lyons' earlier New Adventure Conundrum, and again features the Land of Fiction first seen the 1968 serial The Mind Robber.

Head Games continues a theme running through the New Adventures starting from Timewyrm: Revelation in which the Doctor becomes Time's Champion, and that previous incarnations still in some sense exist within his mind. This novel suggests that the Seventh Doctor was somehow able to terminate the life of his previous incarnation on Lakertya (in the story Time and the Rani) in order to become Time's Champion. This in turn caused the Sixth Doctor to eventually turn into the Valeyard — the evil version of the Doctor seen in the serial The Trial of a Time Lord.

Plot

A flaw in the structure of the Universe is allowing energy from the Land of Fiction to seep through. The Doctor and his companions must close the gap to save the Universe, but the TARDIS is unable to navigate the crystallised cloud of fictional energy around the gap. The Doctor lands on the crystal's surface, and he, Benny and Chris pass through the crystal, navigating through their individual dreams as the fictional energy gives them form. Once they reach the crystal's interior they must put force-field generators in place around the gap, and Roz, who is waiting by the controls in the TARDIS, will then be able to squeeze the gap shut. But the Doctor has withheld one fact from his companions for fear of alienating them. The gap has opened above the dying planet Detrios, and its inhabitants have unwittingly reshaped the fictional energy into the crystal Miracle which is providing light and power to their world. When the Doctor closes the gap, the Miracle will vanish, and Detrios really will be doomed.

Things get even more complicated when the fictional energy finds a focus in Jason, the young Writer who was returned to Earth by the Time Lords after the Doctor's last encounter with the Land of Fiction. As the fictional energy floods into this Universe, Jason finds that his wishes and dreams are coming true. A fictional double of the Doctor, Dr. Who, appears in the TARDIS, knocks out the real Doctor before he can enter the crystal, and sends him to the fictional Galactic Prison for the crime of trying to wipe out the Detrians. Dr. Who then picks up Jason, his new companion, and they set off to have neat adventures, beat up green monsters, and arrest the evil Doctor's accomplices. Roz, uncertain of the extent of the newcomers’ powers, hides in the TARDIS corridors and waits for an opportunity to make her move.

Jason and Dr. Who try to remove Benny and Chris from the Miracle, but as the TARDIS is unable to materialise within, it is diverted to Detrios. There, Jason agrees to help the hapless Politik Darnak to defeat the green lizard monsters which are about to attack his Citadel. In fact Darnak is just a low-grade civil servant who sees promotion prospects in these helpful aliens, and the lizard people have a rich culture of their own which has suffered under the oppressive rule of the human upper classes. Oblivious to the wider issues, Dr. Who whips up an ACME Lizard Monster Eradicator from spare parts and instantly exterminates ninety percent of the planet's lizard population. Darnak can’t believe that the problem has been solved so easily, but his denial irritates Jason, and moments later the Citadel is attacked by a giant dinosaur. Jason discovers its one weak point and defeats it through a combination of observation, clever thinking and bravery—except of course that he’d created the dinosaur and thus its weakness as well, and in the process of defeating it, a dozen guards have been horribly killed and the Citadel has been destroyed. Jason and Dr. Who depart, leaving Darnak with the unenviable task of explaining the fiasco to the Detrian Superior.

The Detrians detect intruders on the Miracle and transmat Chris to their planet for interrogation, where he's horrified to learn that the Doctor nearly tricked him into committing genocide. He is imprisoned with a young rebel, Kat’lanna, who was arrested after the extermination of the lizard people and has given up her hope for a new world order; talking with Chris, however, restores her hope that things can get better, even when he admits that he and his friends were trying to destroy the Miracle. Kat tricks their guard, steals his keys and helps her fellow prisoners to escape, but back at the rebel stronghold they are betrayed and captured by followers of Enros, the Undying One. Enros believes that he created the Miracle and that his death will mean its destruction; he also believes that one day aliens will descend and worship him. When Chris refuses to do so, Kat is taken to be executed while Enros prepares to sacrifice Chris in public before his followers.

Dr. Who and Jason travel to the decrepit leisure world Avalone, where the Doctor's former companion Mel has been stranded alone for months. At first, she's delighted to see the TARDIS, but then Dr. Who and Jason imprison her in Galactic Prison along with the Doctor. Dr. Who and Jason then land on the Miracle, venture inside and kidnap Benny, but while they’re busy Jason's attention wanders and the fictional Galactic Prison vanishes—leaving Mel and the Doctor at the mercy of the fictional dinosaurs which Jason left to guard the grounds. He eventually forgets about the dinosaurs as well, but by that time many of the planet's primitive natives have been slaughtered. The angry primitives blame the Doctor and Mel and prepare to burn them at the stake, but they are saved at the last moment when Dr. Who and Jason return with Benny, causing the Prison and the dinosaurs to return. The Doctor and Mel are no longer within the confines of the prison, and thus escape as the dinosaurs tear into the fleeing tribesmen. Mel, however, has begun to worry about the Doctor's newly secretive nature and is puzzled by Dr. Who's claim that the Doctor is responsible for the destruction of the Althosian system and the Silurian Earth. Roz emerges from hiding to rescue Benny from Dr. Who and Jason, but when they are reunited with the Doctor, Mel is appalled by his new gun-toting, casually violent companions. Together, they steal a cartoon spaceship from the Prison and attempt to return to the Miracle, but Jason and Dr. Who pursue them in the TARDIS. Jason decides that the TARDIS has weapons, and it therefore does—and Dr. Who shoots down the escaping prisoners’ ship, blowing it up in the vacuum of space...

Dr. Who and Jason then return to Detrios to arrest Chris, and the materialisation of the TARDIS distracts Enros’ followers just as Chris is about to be sacrificed. Still disoriented and confused from the drugs which the cultists gave him, Chris accuses Dr. Who of trying to commit genocide, and Jason and Dr. Who realise that he was unaware of the Doctor's evil plans and welcome him aboard as part of the team. As Chris recovers in the TARDIS, Jason and Dr. Who travel to a cafe in Glebe to try to arrest Ace, but she realises that Dr. Who isn’t the real Doctor and fights back. Unable to defeat her, Jason panics and flees, deciding to forget that she ever existed—and as Ace has no way of finding them by herself, she uses her time-hopper to travel to 2002, in order to conduct research on historical anomalies in the hope of tracking them down.

Jason and Dr. Who then take the puzzled Chris to Earth to right wrongs and topple evil dictatorships, and decide to start in England. Dr. Who gets himself arrested in order to contact rebel elements in prison, but only succeeds in freeing several dangerous criminals who instantly flee into the streets rather than join his rebel army. Jason also tries to contact the “resistance”, but only finds student protestors who think he's out of his mind. He eventually storms Buckingham Palace with a fictional battletank, only to find that the Queen has gone to Sheffield to dedicate a new sports centre. Jason and Dr. Who set off to assassinate her, concluding that since she's the head of the oppressive English dictatorship, then getting rid of her will usher in a new era of peace.
The Doctor, Benny, Roz and Mel find themselves on Earth; in Jason's world, the arch-villains are always inexplicably resurrected for the sequel. The Doctor leaves Benny and Roz to watch over Buckingham Palace in case Jason returns, while he sets off for Sheffield with the increasingly hostile Mel. But the Doctor's frustration boils over when their train is delayed by the vagaries of British Rail. The voice of his sixth incarnation shouts at him in his mind, accusing him of horrific crimes, and his guilt forces him to admit to Mel that he deliberately influenced her to leave him so he could go about his mission as Time's Champion without her simplistic morality interfering. She is horrified by this revelation, and realises that he truly is no longer the Doctor she knew.

The Doctor and Mel reach Sheffield moments too late, and Dr. Who guns down the Queen with smart bullets which evade innocent bystanders and smash into the Queen's chest. And yet the Queen survives without a scratch, proof that Jason knows deep down that what he's doing is wrong. Ace has found this odd incident in newspaper reports—and was told of its significance by a future Doctor—but Dr. Who and Jason get away from her again. She is, however, reunited with the Doctor and Mel, who is horrified to see that Ace has become a callous soldier.

Jason and Dr. Who, apparently believing that they’ve assassinated the ruler of Britain, return to Buckingham Palace, drive out the staff and set up a force field to keep them out; however, Benny and Roz join forces with UNIT under Brigadier Winifred Bambera and use Roz's force rifle to bleed energy into the force field until it overloads. Meanwhile, the Doctor finds his TARDIS in Sheffield and travels to the Palace to confront Jason; however, Dr. Who and Chris both confront the Doctor over his past crimes. The Doctor claims that the Detrians’ grim position is their own fault, as the upper classes had plenty of warning that their sun was dying but wasted time in internecine squabbling rather than searching for ways to save their world. The Miracle is a stopgap solution only, and will destroy the Universe as a side effect. And Jason is just as guilty of genocide as is the Doctor; he's already wiped out the lizards of Detrios just because they looked like green monsters, and has decimated the tribal population where he thoughtlessly set down his “Galactic Prison” and guard dinosaurs. At this point, UNIT forces storm the palace, and Jason panics and releases a fireball which kills everyone; fortunately, the Doctor uses the fictional energy surrounding Jason to survive, and convinces him to use his powers to resurrect everyone. Jason finally acknowledges the need to grow up, and Dr. Who vanishes, his work done.

The Doctor takes Jason and his former and current companions back to the Miracle to finish his work, but Mel refuses to help him destroy a world, and Chris insists upon returning to Detrios to rescue Kat’lanna. Roz insists upon helping him, and the Doctor has no choice but to let them go their own way. Jason agrees to help the Doctor, and he, Ace and the Doctor thus venture out onto the Miracle. The Detrians have posted guards to stop them from destroying the Miracle, but Benny emerges from the TARDIS at the last moment to help fight them off; sadly, Mel doesn’t. The Doctor, Ace and Jason then travel through the Miracle, but as the Doctor travels through his own dreams he's confronted by his guilt made manifest in the form of his sixth incarnation. The Sixth Doctor accuses the Seventh of cutting his incarnation short in order to become Time's Champion, of genocide, and of the manipulation and betrayal of his companions. The Seventh Doctor is forced to fight his way past the raving Sixth, and sees him transforming into the Valeyard as they do battle.

Kat’lanna's fellow rebels rescue her from Enros’ followers; meanwhile, Enros decides to legitimise his claim to be Detrios’ true ruler, and sends his followers into the Citadel to assassinate the Superior and seize control of the planet. As this leaves Enros himself relatively unguarded, the remaining rebels decide to take the opportunity to assassinate him, but Kat recalls Chris’ claim that the Miracle was created by the beliefs of the Detrians—which means that if enough people believe the Miracle will vanish when Enros dies, then it will. If this happens, Detrios will never shake off his warped religion. Kat thus tries to stop her fellow rebels, and the delay gives the Doctor, Ace and Jason enough time they need to finish their work. As the Miracle fades away, Enros’ hold over his followers is broken, and thus nobody notices when he is killed. Meanwhile, Chris and Roz are unable to locate Kat’lanna, and when Chris sees the terrible poverty and deprivation in which the ordinary Detrians live he gives in to despair, concluding that it was foolish and pointless to try rescuing just one person. He and Roz return to the TARDIS, unaware that Kat’lanna and her fellow rebels have used the death of the Miracle as a foundation for a new order; now that it's gone the Detrians have no choice but to abandon their illusory hopes, and start looking for real, constructive ways of restoring power to their world. For the first time there is real hope for the future. But Kat’lanna never understands why Chris didn’t try to come back for her as he’d promised.

The Doctor returns Jason, Ace and Mel to their proper times, but he and Mel part on bitter terms. Ace promises to try to talk some sense into Mel—and quietly passes on a message for the Doctor from his future incarnation. As Roz tries to help Chris come to terms with his perceived failure, the Doctor seals off the memory of the Sixth Doctor in his mind, knowing that he must continue to resist the temptation to regenerate into his eighth incarnation; that moment of weakness could give the Valeyard the chance he needs to break free. He then promises Benny that he’ll set the co-ordinates at random so they can have a simple adventure like the ones they used to have, but again, he's lying. According to Ace, the gap which they’ve just closed was scraped into the Universe by Kadiatu Lethbridge-Stewart's time machine, and the Doctor must deal with her for good before she does any more damage. Once again his duty to the bigger picture must take precedence over the wishes of his companions.

References

External links
The Cloister Library - Head Games

1995 British novels
1995 science fiction novels
Virgin New Adventures
Novels by Steve Lyons
Seventh Doctor novels